Mateusz Kieliszkowski  (born 12 August 1993) is a Polish strongman competitor. He is particularly known for his impressive pressing ability within strongman, as well as his prowess in the Atlas Stones and various moving events.

Strongman career
Mateusz Kieliszkowski had an interest in strength sports in high school. He then became interested in strongman specifically at the age of 17 after taking part in a strongman competition organised by his friend. Mateusz achieved his first big success by winning the 2014 Arnold amateur competition which allowed him to compete in the professional 2015 Arnold Classic which he would place 3rd.

In 2016 he would place 4th at Europe's Strongest Man and the Arnold's Strongman Classic. He also qualified for World's Strongest Man for the first time and finished 7th.

In 2017 he would win his first international competition the Arnold's Africa. He would place 4th at The Arnold's Strongman Classic and 6th at the Worlds Strongest Man that year. 

In 2018 Mateusz would podium at Worlds Strongest Man finishing 2nd behind Hafpor Julius Bjornsonn and also came 4th at the Arnold's that year. He would also win 2 Giant's Live Competitions that year. 

2019 Mateusz would again finish 2nd at the World's Strongest Man this time to Martin Licis and podiumed at the Arnold's coming 3rd. He would also finish 2nd at Europe's Strongest Man that year aswell. 

In March 2020 despite winning 4 events Mateusz would finish 2nd at the Arnold's Strongman Classic to 3 time champion Hafpor Julius Bjornsonn. He would miss World's Strongest Man that year and the next due to a triceps injury and complications with the Surgery. 

In 2021 Mateusz competed at World's Ultimate Strongman and the Rogue Invitational placing 2nd and 4th respectively. He would then sit out all of 2022 to heal his injuries.

In March 2023 Mateusz returned to the Arnold's Strongman Classic competition after a 2 year absence and finished 2nd to Mitchell Hooper.

Personal records

Strongman
Deadlift with straps and suit – 
Log lift - 
Circus dumbbell press –  (World Record) 
Cyr dumbbell press –  (World Record)
Frame Carry -  up a  ramp in 7:00 Seconds (World Record)
Car Walk  – 10.00 Seconds (World Record) 
Odd Haugen tombstone to shoulder -  × 5 reps in 150.00 Seconds (World Record)

References

1993 births
Living people
Polish strength athletes
Polish sportsmen